Bidart is a surname. Notable people with the surname include:

Beba Bidart (1924–1994), Argentine tango singer , actress and dancer
Frank Bidart (born 1939), American academic and poet
Lycia de Biase Bidart (1910–1990), Brazilian pianist, violinist, conductor, music educator and composer